Homoeosoma emandator is a species of snout moth in the genus Homoeosoma. It was described by Carl Heinrich in 1956. It is found in North America.

Taxonomy
It was previously treated as a subspecies of Homoeosoma illuviella.

References

Moths described in 1956
Phycitini